The 2004 United States House of Representatives elections in New Mexico were held on November 2, 2004 to determine who will represent the state of New Mexico in the United States House of Representatives. New Mexico has three seats in the House, apportioned according to the 2000 United States census. Representatives are elected for two-year terms.

Overview

District 1 

Incumbent Republican Heather Wilson defeated Democrat Richard Romero, the president pro tempore of the New Mexico Senate. This district covers the central part of the state.

Democratic primary

General election

District 2 

Incumbent Republican Steve Pearce defeated Democrat Gary King, a former state representative. King won the Democratic nomination over Jeff Steinborn, who worked as an aide to Governor Bill Richardson. The district covers the southern part of the state.

Democratic primary

General election

District 3 

Incumbent Democrat Tom Udall defeated Republican Gregory M. Tucker, a businessman and law professor. The district covers the northern part of the state.

General election

References 

United States House of Representatives elections in New Mexico
New Mexico
United States House of Representatives